Miren Etxezarreta Zubizarreta (born 23 March 1936) is a Spanish Basque economist and intellectual of the left who is closely linked to social movements. Since 2007 she is Professor Emeritus in Applied Economics at the Autonomous University of Barcelona.

She is influenced by Karl Marx, Rosa Luxemburg and post-Keynesian economists such as Joan Robinson as well as Marxist economists such as Paul A. Baran and Paul Sweezy, among others.

Biography 
Etxezarreta is married to the sociologist and economist José Iglesias Fernández Dopazo, with whom they have a son.

References

1936 births
Living people
People from Ordizia
Spanish economists
Spanish women economists
Post-Keynesian economists
Marxian economists
Academic staff of the Autonomous University of Barcelona
Spanish Marxists
Women Marxists